The 2nd constituency of the Alpes-de-Haute-Provence is a French legislative constituency in the Alpes-de-Haute-Provence département. Like all constituencies, it elects one MP via the two-round voting system.

Members elected

Notes

Election results

2022

 
 
 
 
 
 
|-
| colspan="8" bgcolor="#E9E9E9"|
|-

2017

2012

|- style="background-color:#E9E9E9;text-align:center;"
! colspan="2" rowspan="2" style="text-align:left;" | Candidate
! rowspan="2" colspan="2" style="text-align:left;" | Party
! colspan="2" | 1st round
! colspan="2" | 2nd round
|- style="background-color:#E9E9E9;text-align:center;"
! width="75" | Votes
! width="30" | %
! width="75" | Votes
! width="30" | %
|-
| style="background-color:" |
| style="text-align:left;" | Christophe Castaner
| style="text-align:left;" | Socialist Party
| PS
| 
| 35.76%
| 
| 54.04%
|-
| style="background-color:" |
| style="text-align:left;" | Jean-Claude Castel
| style="text-align:left;" | Union for a Popular Movement
| UMP
| 
| 29.77%
| 
| 45.96%
|-
| style="background-color:" |
| style="text-align:left;" | Jean-Claude Diedrich
| style="text-align:left;" | National Front
| FN
| 
| 15.25%
| colspan="2" style="text-align:left;" |
|-
| style="background-color:" |
| style="text-align:left;" | Martine Carriol
| style="text-align:left;" | Left Front
| FG
| 
| 9.37%
| colspan="2" style="text-align:left;" |
|-
| style="background-color:" |
| style="text-align:left;" | Catherine Berthonneche
| style="text-align:left;" | The Greens
| VEC
| 
| 4.39%
| colspan="2" style="text-align:left;" |
|-
| style="background-color:" |
| style="text-align:left;" | Isabelle Verschueren
| style="text-align:left;" | 
| CEN
| 
| 1.62%
| colspan="2" style="text-align:left;" |
|-
| style="background-color:" |
| style="text-align:left;" | Yamina Guebli
| style="text-align:left;" | Ecologist
| ECO
| 
| 0.84%
| colspan="2" style="text-align:left;" |
|-
| style="background-color:" |
| style="text-align:left;" | Bruno Morin
| style="text-align:left;" | 
| NCE
| 
| 0.82%
| colspan="2" style="text-align:left;" |
|-
| style="background-color:" |
| style="text-align:left;" | Noël Chuisano
| style="text-align:left;" | Miscellaneous Right
| DVD
| 
| 0.81%
| colspan="2" style="text-align:left;" |
|-
| style="background-color:" |
| style="text-align:left;" | Jean-Michel Rovida
| style="text-align:left;" | Centrist Alliance
| ALLI
| 
| 0.57%
| colspan="2" style="text-align:left;" |
|-
| style="background-color:" |
| style="text-align:left;" | Brigitte Picard
| style="text-align:left;" | Far Left
| EXG
| 
| 0.46%
| colspan="2" style="text-align:left;" |
|-
| style="background-color:" |
| style="text-align:left;" | Cyril Belmonte
| style="text-align:left;" | Far Left
| EXG
| 
| 0.36%
| colspan="2" style="text-align:left;" |
|-
| colspan="8" style="background-color:#E9E9E9;"|
|- style="font-weight:bold"
| colspan="4" style="text-align:left;" | Total
| 
| 100%
| 
| 100%
|-
| colspan="8" style="background-color:#E9E9E9;"|
|-
| colspan="4" style="text-align:left;" | Registered voters
| 
| style="background-color:#E9E9E9;"|
| 
| style="background-color:#E9E9E9;"|
|-
| colspan="4" style="text-align:left;" | Blank/Void ballots
| 
| 1.54%
| 
| 3.31%
|-
| colspan="4" style="text-align:left;" | Turnout
| 
| 62.22%
| 
| 61.67%
|-
| colspan="4" style="text-align:left;" | Abstentions
| 
| 37.78%
| 
| 38.33%
|-
| colspan="8" style="background-color:#E9E9E9;"|
|- style="font-weight:bold"
| colspan="6" style="text-align:left;" | Result
| colspan="2" style="background-color:" | PS GAIN
|}

2007

|- style="background-color:#E9E9E9;text-align:center;"
! colspan="2" rowspan="2" style="text-align:left;" | Candidate
! rowspan="2" colspan="2" style="text-align:left;" | Party
! colspan="2" | 1st round
! colspan="2" | 2nd round
|- style="background-color:#E9E9E9;text-align:center;"
! width="75" | Votes
! width="30" | %
! width="75" | Votes
! width="30" | %
|-
| style="background-color:" |
| style="text-align:left;" | Daniel Spagnou
| style="text-align:left;" | Union for a Popular Movement
| UMP
| 
| 46.25%
| 
| 53.96%
|-
| style="background-color:" |
| style="text-align:left;" | Christophe Castaner
| style="text-align:left;" | Socialist Party
| PS
| 
| 28.46%
| 
| 46.04%
|-
| style="background-color:" |
| style="text-align:left;" | Isabelle Verschueren
| style="text-align:left;" | Democratic Movement
| MoDem
| 
| 5.75%
| colspan="2" style="text-align:left;" |
|-
| style="background-color:" |
| style="text-align:left;" | Jean-Claude Cauvin
| style="text-align:left;" | Communist
| COM
| 
| 4.53%
| colspan="2" style="text-align:left;" |
|-
| style="background-color:" |
| style="text-align:left;" | Mireille D'Ornano
| style="text-align:left;" | National Front
| FN
| 
| 4.31%
| colspan="2" style="text-align:left;" |
|-
| style="background-color:" |
| style="text-align:left;" | Patrick Garnon
| style="text-align:left;" | The Greens
| VEC
| 
| 2.85%
| colspan="2" style="text-align:left;" |
|-
| style="background-color:" |
| style="text-align:left;" | Karine Denko
| style="text-align:left;" | Far Left
| EXG
| 
| 2.09%
| colspan="2" style="text-align:left;" |
|-
| style="background-color:" |
| style="text-align:left;" | Gilles Ravera
| style="text-align:left;" | Hunting, Fishing, Nature, Traditions
| CPNT
| 
| 1.59%
| colspan="2" style="text-align:left;" |
|-
| style="background-color:" |
| style="text-align:left;" | Jeannine Douzon
| style="text-align:left;" | Movement for France
| MPF
| 
| 1.08%
| colspan="2" style="text-align:left;" |
|-
| style="background-color:" |
| style="text-align:left;" | Véronique Raphel
| style="text-align:left;" | Ecologist
| ECO
| 
| 0.98%
| colspan="2" style="text-align:left;" |
|-
| style="background-color:" |
| style="text-align:left;" | Xavier Dejasmin
| style="text-align:left;" | Divers
| DIV
| 
| 0.81%
| colspan="2" style="text-align:left;" |
|-
| style="background-color:" |
| style="text-align:left;" | Michèle Chassaing
| style="text-align:left;" | Far Right
| EXD
| 
| 0.45%
| colspan="2" style="text-align:left;" |
|-
| style="background-color:" |
| style="text-align:left;" | Max Illy
| style="text-align:left;" | Far Left
| EXG
| 
| 0.45%
| colspan="2" style="text-align:left;" |
|-
| style="background-color:" |
| style="text-align:left;" | Claude Senes
| style="text-align:left;" | Far Left
| EXG
| 
| 0.40%
| colspan="2" style="text-align:left;" |
|-
| colspan="8" style="background-color:#E9E9E9;"|
|- style="font-weight:bold"
| colspan="4" style="text-align:left;" | Total
| 
| 100%
| 
| 100%
|-
| colspan="8" style="background-color:#E9E9E9;"|
|-
| colspan="4" style="text-align:left;" | Registered voters
| 
| style="background-color:#E9E9E9;"|
| 
| style="background-color:#E9E9E9;"|
|-
| colspan="4" style="text-align:left;" | Blank/Void ballots
| 
| 1.67%
| 
| 2.96%
|-
| colspan="4" style="text-align:left;" | Turnout
| 
| 65.94%
| 
| 65.60%
|-
| colspan="4" style="text-align:left;" | Abstentions
| 
| 34.06%
| 
| 34.40%
|-
| colspan="8" style="background-color:#E9E9E9;"|
|- style="font-weight:bold"
| colspan="6" style="text-align:left;" | Result
| colspan="2" style="background-color:" | UMP HOLD
|}

2002

 
 
 
 
 
 
 
 
 
|-
| colspan="8" bgcolor="#E9E9E9"|
|-

1997

 
 
 
 
 
 
|-
| colspan="8" bgcolor="#E9E9E9"|
|-

Sources
 Official results of French elections from 1998:

References

2